Myxedema coma is an extreme or decompensated form of hypothyroidism and while uncommon, is potentially lethal. A person may have laboratory values identical to a "normal" hypothyroid state, but a stressful event (such as an infection, myocardial infarction, or stroke) precipitates the myxedema coma state, usually in the elderly. Primary symptoms of myxedema coma are altered mental status and low body temperature. Low blood sugar, low blood pressure, hyponatremia, hypercapnia, hypoxia, slowed heart rate, and hypoventilation may also occur. Myxedema, although included in the name, is not necessarily seen in myxedema coma. Coma is also not necessarily seen in myxedema coma.

According to newer theories, myxedema coma could result from allostatic overload in a situation where the effects of hypothyroidism are amplified by nonthyroidal illness syndrome.

Causes
Myxedema coma represents an extreme or decompensated form of hypothyroidism. Most cases occur in patients who have been previously diagnosed with hypothyroidism, yet in some cases, hypothyroidism may not have been previously identified. 

Common precipitating factors of myxedema coma include:
 Hypothermia, especially during winter months
 Metabolic disruption including hypoglycemia, hyponatremia, acidosis, and hypercalcemia
 Respiratory compromise including hypoxemia and hypercapnia
 Infections including pneumonia, cellulitis, and urosepsis
 Congestive heart failure
 Cerebrovascular accidents
 Gastrointestinal bleeding
 Trauma, motor vehicle accidents, and fractures
 Medications including anesthetics, sedatives, tranquilizers, narcotics, amiodarone, and lithium
 Withdrawal of thyroid supplements, especially in relation to a hospitalization

Other precipitating factors include:
 Other medications including beta-blockers, diuretics, phenothiazines, phenytoin, rifampin, anti-TNF therapy
 Burns
 Influenza
 Surgery
 Consumption of raw bok choy
 Diabetic ketoacidosis after total thyroidectomy

Pathophysiology
The thyroid gland is responsible for regulating whole-body metabolism through the production of two major hormones: thyroxine (T4) and triiodothyronine (T3). Of the metabolically active thyroid hormones, 93% is T4 and 7% is T3. T3 is four times more potent than T4 and most T4 is converted to T3 in the tissues. Iodine is necessary for adequate hormone production. Thyroid-stimulating hormone (TSH) is a circulating or serum hormone from the pituitary gland that stimulates the thyroid gland to produce T3 and T4. Hypothyroidism occurs when the thyroid gland does not produce enough T3 and T4.

The most common cause of hypothyroidism worldwide is too little dietary iodine. Hashimoto's thyroiditis is the most common cause of hypothyroidism in countries with sufficient dietary iodine. With the cessation of the production of thyroid hormone, the thyroid gland contains enough reserve T3 and T4 to last 2 to 3 months.

The thyroid hormones T3 and T4 influence the production by virtually all cells in the body of hundreds of new intracellular proteins and enzymes. This influence includes the expression of the calcium ATPase, regulation of ion channels, oxidative phosphorylation, increased Na-K-ATPase activity, increased carbohydrate metabolism, increased free fatty acids, increased vitamin requirements, and increased overall metabolism. The absence of the thyroid hormones T3 and T4 are responsible for many bodily functions at the genetic and cellular level and an absence of these thyroid hormones as seen in myxedema coma has very serious consequences including a broad spectrum of symptoms and a high mortality rate.

Diagnosis
Clinical features of myxedema coma:

Cardiovascular
Bradycardia
Bundle branch blocks
Complete heart block and arrhythmias
Cardiomegaly
Elevated diastolic blood pressure—early
Hypotension—late
Low cardiac output
Non-specific ECG findings
Pericardial effusion
Polymorphic ventricular tachycardia (torsades de pointes)
Prolonged QT interval
Respiratory
Hypoxia
Hypercapnia
Hyperventilation
Myxedema of the larynx
Pleural effusion
Gastrointestinal
Abdominal distention
Abdominal pain
Anasarca
Anorexia and nausea
Decreased motility
Fecal impaction and constipation
Gastrointestinal atony or ileus
Myxedema or toxic megacolon—late
Neurogenic oropharyngeal dysphagia
ileus
Neurological
Altered mentation
Coma
Confusion and obtundation
Delayed tendon reflexes
Depression
Poor cognitive function
Psychosis
Seizures
Renal and urinary function
Bladder dystonia and distension
Fluid retention
Appearance and dermatological 
Alopecia
Coarse, sparse hair
Dry, cool, doughy skin
Myxedematous face
Generalized swelling
Goiter
Macroglossia
Non-pitting edema
Ptosis
Periorbital edema
Surgical scar from prior thyroidectomy
Hypothermia

Laboratory features in myxedema coma:
Anemia
Elevated creatine kinase (CPK)
Elevated creatinine
Elevated transaminases
Hypercapnia
Hypercholesterolemia (elevated LDL)
Hyperlipidemia
Hypoglycemia
Hyponatremia
Hypoxia
Leukopenia
Respiratory acidosis

Epidemiology
Hypothyroidism is four times more common in women than men. The incidence of myxedema coma has been reported to be 0.22 per 1000000 per year but the data is limited and especially lacking in countries outside the western world and countries along the equator. Myxedema coma is most common in people 60 years old and older and is most common in the winter months when hypothermia is more common.

See also
 Thyroid storm
 Euthyroid sick syndrome

References

External links 

Thyroid disease
Coma